2308 Schilt, provisional designation , is a stony Eunomia asteroid from the asteroid belt, approximately 17 kilometers in diameter. It was discovered on 6 May 1967, by Argentine astronomer Carlos Cesco together with American astronomer Arnold Klemola at the Yale–Columbia Southern Station at Leoncito Astronomical Complex in Argentina.

Orbit and classification 

Schilt is a member of the Eunomia family, a large group of stony asteroids and the most prominent family in the intermediate main-belt. It orbits the Sun in the central main-belt at a distance of 2.1–3.0 AU once every 4 years and 1 month (1,487 days). Its orbit has an eccentricity of 0.17 and an inclination of 14° with respect to the ecliptic. The asteroids observation arc begins with its discovery in 1967. However, the first (unused) precovery was already taken at Heidelberg Observatory in 1921.

Physical characteristics 

In the SMASS taxonomy, Schilt has been characterized as a common S-type asteroid.

Rotation period 

A rotational lightcurve was obtained based on photometric observations at the Australian Oakley Southern Sky Observatory in August 2012. The lightcurve showed a period of  hours with a brightness amplitude of 0.44 in magnitude.

Diameter and albedo 

According to the surveys carried out by the Infrared Astronomical Satellite (IRAS) and NASA's Wide-field Infrared Survey Explorer with its subsequent NEOWISE mission, the asteroid measures between 13.8 and 17.7 kilometers in diameter and its surface has an albedo in the range of 0.10–0.17. The Collaborative Asteroid Lightcurve Link derives an albedo of 0.10 and a diameter of 17.5 kilometers.

Naming 

This minor planet was named after Dutch–American astronomer Jan Schilt (1894–1982), one of the founders of the discovering Columbia–Yale Southern Station in the early 1960s, for which he collaborated with local astronomer and with Yale's Dirk Brouwer, after whom the minor planet 1746 Brouwer is named. At Columbia University, Schilt's research included the dynamics and structure of galaxies, and improvements on measuring the brightness of stars. The official naming citation was published by the Minor Planet Center on 11 December 1981.

Notes

References

External links 
  Observatorio Astronómico Salvador, homepage
 Asteroid Lightcurve Database (LCDB), query form (info )
 Dictionary of Minor Planet Names, Google books
 Asteroids and comets rotation curves, CdR – Observatoire de Genève, Raoul Behrend
 Discovery Circumstances: Numbered Minor Planets (1)-(5000) – Minor Planet Center
 
 

002308
Discoveries by Carlos Ulrrico Cesco
Discoveries by Arnold Klemola
Named minor planets
002308
19670506